Nobel disease or Nobelitis is the embracing of strange or scientifically unsound ideas by some Nobel Prize winners, usually later in life. It has been argued that the effect results, in part, from a tendency for Nobel winners to feel empowered by the award to speak on topics outside their specific area of expertise, although it is unknown whether Nobel Prize winners are more prone to this tendency than other individuals. Paul Nurse, co-winner of the 2001 Nobel Prize in Physiology or Medicine, warned later laureates against "believing you are expert in almost everything, and being prepared to express opinions about most issues with great confidence, sheltering behind the authority that the Nobel Prize can give you". Nobel disease has been described as a tongue-in-cheek term.

Implications
While it remains unclear whether Nobel winners are statistically more prone to critical thinking errors than are other scientists, the phenomenon is of interest because it provides an existence proof that  being an authority in one field does not necessarily make one an authority in any other field, and, to the extent that winning a Nobel Prize serves as a proxy indicator of scientific brilliance and high general intelligence, such characteristics are not incompatible with irrationality.

Nobel disease also serves to demonstrate that, for some prize winners, being universally hailed as right appears to bolster the individual laureate's confirmation bias more than it does their skepticism. Milton Friedman, winner of the Nobel Memorial Prize in Economic Sciences in 1976, said of the Nobel disease, as it relates to his economic thinking towards an "antidote", the following:

Winners reported as examples

Charles Richet
Charles Richet won the 1913 Nobel Prize in Physiology or Medicine for his research on anaphylaxis. He also believed in extrasensory perception, paranormal activity, dowsing, and ghosts.

Linus Pauling
Linus Pauling won the 1954 Nobel Prize in Chemistry for his work on chemical bonds. A decade before winning the prize, he was diagnosed with Bright's disease which he treated in part by ingesting vitamin supplements, which he claimed dramatically improved his condition.  He later espoused taking high doses of vitamin C to reduce the likelihood and severity of experiencing the common cold.  Pauling himself consumed amounts of vitamin C on a daily basis that were more than 120 times the recommended daily intake. He further argued that megadoses of vitamin C have therapeutic value for treating schizophrenia and for prolonging cancer patients' lives.  These claims are not supported by the best available science.

William Shockley 
William Shockley, who won the 1956 Nobel Prize in Physics for his invention of the transistor, promoted racialism and eugenics.

James Watson
James Watson was awarded the 1962 Nobel Prize in Physiology or Medicine, together with Francis Crick and Maurice Wilkins, "for their discoveries concerning the molecular structure of nucleic acids and its significance for information transfer in living material". Since at least 2000, Watson has consistently and publicly claimed that black people are inherently less intelligent than white people, and that exposure to sunlight in tropical regions and higher levels of melanin cause dark-skinned people to have a higher sex drive.

Nikolaas Tinbergen
Nikolaas Tinbergen won the 1973 Nobel Prize in Physiology or Medicine for discoveries concerning the organization and elicitation of individual and social behavior patterns in animals. During his Nobel acceptance speech, Tinbergen promoted the widely discredited "refrigerator mother" hypothesis of the causation of autism, thereby setting a "nearly unbeatable record for shortest time between receiving the Nobel Prize and saying something really stupid about a field in which the recipient had little experience." In 1985, Tinbergen coauthored a book with his wife that recommended the use of "holding therapy" for autism, a form of treatment that is empirically unsupported and that can be physically dangerous.

Brian Josephson
Brian Josephson won the Nobel Prize in Physics in 1973 for his prediction of the Josephson effect.  Josephson has promoted a number of scientifically unsupported or discredited beliefs, including the homeopathic notion that water can somehow "remember" the chemical properties of substances diluted within it, the view that transcendental meditation is helpful for bringing unconscious traumatic memories into conscious awareness, and the possibility that humans can communicate with each other by telepathy.

Kary Mullis
Kary Mullis won the 1993 Nobel Prize in Chemistry for development of the polymerase chain reaction. Mullis disagreed with the accepted, and scientifically verified, view that AIDS is caused by the HIV virus.

Luc Montagnier
Luc Montagnier co-discovered HIV in 1980, for which he won the 2008 Nobel Prize in Physiology or Medicine. In 2009, in a non-peer-reviewed paper in a journal that he had founded, Montagnier claimed that solutions containing the DNA of pathogenic bacteria and viruses could emit low frequency radio waves that induce surrounding water molecules to become arranged into "nanostructures".  He suggested water could retain such properties even after the original solutions were massively diluted, to the point where the original DNA had effectively vanished, and that water could retain the "memory" of substances with which it had been in contact – claims that place his work in close alignment with the pseudoscientific tenets of homeopathy. He further claimed that DNA sequence information could be 'teleported' to a separate test tube of purified water via these radio waves. He explained this in the framework of quantum field theory. He has supported the scientifically discredited view that vaccines cause autism and has claimed that antibiotics are of therapeutic value in the treatment of autism.

See also
Argument from authority
Dunning–Kruger effect
Nobel Prize controversies
Nobel Prize effect
Sutor, ne ultra crepidam

References 

Epistemology of science
Nobel Prize
Scientific skepticism